There are 56 municipalities classified as cities in Pennsylvania. 
Each city is further classified based on population, with Philadelphia being of the first class, Pittsburgh of the second class, Scranton of the second class A, and the remaining 53 cities being of the third class.

While the default form of government for third class cities is the Third Class City Code, only 18 cities still use this form of government. The City of Parker is the only city that still operates under a special act, and has a weak mayor-council form of government. All 3 cities not of the third class, along with 22 third class cities, have adopted home rule charters, which give the cities broader powers to manage their affairs. When a city adopts a home rule charter, it does not lose its status as a city nor its classification. In addition, 2 cities have adopted optional plans under the same law. From 1957 to 1972, third class cities were able to adopt optional charters, of which 10 remain in effect. Cities that operate under home rule charters, optional plans, or optional charters are also found in the List of Pennsylvania municipalities and counties with home rule charters, optional charters, or optional plans.

Home rule municipalities that are styled as cities but not classified as cities are not included below.

Cities gallery

List of cities in Pennsylvania

† County Seat

See also
List of cities and boroughs in Pennsylvania by population
List of municipalities in Pennsylvania
List of counties in Pennsylvania
List of Pennsylvania Municipalities and Counties with Home Rule Charters, Optional Charters, or Optional Plans
List of towns and boroughs in Pennsylvania
List of townships in Pennsylvania

References

 Cities in Pennsylvania
Pennsylvania, List of cities in
Cities